Alie Street is a 400 metre long street located in Aldgate, East London. It links Mansell Street with Commercial Road.
For much of its history, the western part was known as Great Alie Street, with the eastern part called Little Alie Street.

History

Originally called Ayliff Street, it was named after a relative of William Leman, whose great-uncle, John Leman had bought Goodman's Fields earlier in the seventeenth century. Alie Street ran along the northern side, with Leman Street to the east, Prescot Street to the south, and Mansell Street to the West. These new streets developed in the late seventeenth century while Goodman's Fields was used as a tenterground. 

From the 1800s to the late 20th century, the western section from Mansell Street to Leman Street was known as Great Alie Street, with an extension going east from Leman Street to Commercial Road being known as Little Alie Street.

References

Aldgate
Streets in the London Borough of Tower Hamlets